Picea farreri is a species of conifer in the pine family, Pinaceae. It is known by the common name Farrer's spruce. It is native to China, where it is known only from Yunnan, and to Myanmar.

This tree can reach 35 meters tall. It grows on limestone soils in cool, wet mountainous habitat.

Picea farreri is named after the plant collector Reginald Farrer who travelled extensively in China and what was then Burma.

References

farreri
Vulnerable plants
Trees of Myanmar
Trees of China
Flora of Yunnan
Vulnerable flora of Asia
Taxonomy articles created by Polbot